Patrika Darbo (born April 6, 1948) is an American actress. She is known for her roles as Nancy Wesley and Shirley Spectra in the television soap operas Days of Our Lives and The Bold and the Beautiful, respectively.

In 2016, Darbo won a Primetime Emmy Award for Outstanding Actress in a Short Form Comedy or Drama Series for her role in the online comedy series Acting Dead, becoming the first winner in that category.

Early life
Patrika Darbo was born in Jacksonville, Florida, the daughter of Patricia, a restaurant hostess, and "Chubby," a nightclub manager.  At age six her parents divorced; her mother then remarried Donald Davidson when Darbo was 11. She grew up in Atlanta, Georgia.  She studied theater at Georgia Southern University in Statesboro, Georgia, graduating in 1970, and later attended the Atlanta School of Drama. She worked as a credit manager until 1984, when she began a professional acting career.

Career
By 1991, Darbo had featured in numerous stage, film and television credits and was contracted to the ABC network. In 1991, the Los Angeles Times reported that Darbo was undertaking a personal campaign to seek nomination for an Academy Award for Best Supporting Actress for her role in Daddy's Dyin': Who's Got the Will?, written by Del Shores.

Darbo appeared as Penny Baker on Step by Step (1991–1992). In 1992, she appeared in the feature film Leaving Normal under the name 66 with Meg Tilly and Christine Lahti. In 1993, she played Pam Magnus, a banking employee killed by John Malkovich's character in the Clint Eastwood film "In the Line of Fire". In 1994, she starred as Roseanne Barr in an NBC television movie, Roseanne and Tom: Behind the Scenes. She starred as Miss Spencer in Ruby Bridges (1998). From 1998 to 2005, Darbo played Nancy Wesley on the NBC soap opera Days of Our Lives, a role that earned her an Emmy nomination for outstanding supporting actress in 2000. 

Darbo was a guest star in two Seinfeld episodes; "The Revenge" (1991) and "The Sniffing Accountant" (1993).  Later, in 2010, she also guest starred in Showtime's Dexter as a landlady. In 2009 and 2012, Darbo briefly played the role of Jean on Desperate Housewives. Between 2010 and 2012, she portrayed the recurring role of Dr Freed in the teen drama web series Miss Behave.

In 2012, Darbo played Grams in Mickey Matson and the Copperhead Conspiracy. In November 2012, it was announced that Darbo would reprise her role as Nancy Wesley on Days of Our Lives in 2013. After a three-year absence, Darbo returned to the series in the fall of 2016.

In 2016, Darbo won a Primetime Emmy Award for Outstanding Actress in a Short Form Comedy or Drama Series for her work in the series Acting Dead. She is the first winner of this category.

From February 2017 to March 2018, Darbo starred as Shirley Spectra on The Bold and the Beautiful. She briefly returned in November 2018.

In 2018, Darbo played Rosie in God Bless The Broken Road.

Personal life
Darbo has been married to director Rolf Peter Darbo since 1973.

Filmography

Film

Television

Awards and nominations

References

External links

1948 births
American film actresses
American soap opera actresses
American television actresses
American voice actresses
Living people
Actresses from Atlanta
Actresses from Jacksonville, Florida
20th-century American actresses
21st-century American actresses